My World ... and Welcome to It is an American half-hour television sitcom based on the humor and cartoons of James Thurber. 

It starred William Windom as John Monroe, a Thurber-like writer and cartoonist who works for a magazine closely resembling The New Yorker called The Manhattanite. Wry, fanciful and curmudgeonly, Monroe observes and comments on life, to the bemusement of his wife Ellen (Joan Hotchkis) and daughter Lydia (Lisa Gerritsen). Monroe's frequent daydreams and fantasies are usually based on Thurber material.

The series, which ran for one season during the 1969–70 season on NBC, was created by Mel Shavelson, who wrote and directed the pilot episode and was one of its principal writers. Sheldon Leonard was executive producer. The show's producer, Danny Arnold, co-wrote or directed numerous episodes, and appeared as Santa Claus in "Rally Round the Flag."

Series description
Most episodes open with Monroe arriving in front of the house from the Thurber cartoon "Home," which in the original cartoon has a woman's face on one side of it.  In the show, the house is initially house-shaped. The woman's face is often animated to appear, as Ellen says something to John. The "Home" house, without the face, is used as an establishing shot throughout the episodes. Other Thurber cartoons are similarly animated over the course of the series—sometimes in the opening sequence, sometimes later in the episode. The episode "Cristabel" begins with Monroe lying on top of a cartoon doghouse, a reference to the non-Thurber cartoon character Snoopy. Animation for the series was by DePatie-Freleng Enterprises. 

Henry Morgan had a recurring role as Philip Jensen, a writer for The Manhattanite, who was based on humorist Robert Benchley. Harold J. Stone played the editor, with whom Monroe is often at odds about the cartoon content. A female writer who appeared in one episode was also loosely based on Dorothy Parker. Guest-stars included Lee Meriwether, Paul Ford, Joe Besser, Ray Walston, Craig Stevens, Danny Bonaduce, Talia Shire (as Talia Coppola), Cindy Williams, James Gregory and Noam Pitlik.

Live action adaptations of Thurber's writing were another show staple.  For example, "Rally Round the Flag," in which Monroe purchases a very large flag as a gift, is loosely based on a Thurber piece called "There's a Time for Flags." An incident with a policeman in "Cristabel" is an almost verbatim transcription of the Thurber story "The Topaz Cufflinks Mystery." Fables for Our Time is another source, as when John Monroe sees a unicorn in the back yard, a reference to "The Unicorn in the Garden." Many of the episode titles are taken from Thurber's Fables for Our Time (e.g., "The Shrike and the Chipmunks") and other writings ("Rules for a Happy Marriage" and many more).

The character name of John Monroe is Thurber’s alter-ego in his book Owl in the Attic. Monroe and his family first came to television in a 1959 Alcoa Theatre/Goodyear Theatre production called "Cristabel (The Secret Life of John Monroe)." also written by Mel Shavelson. The dog Cristabel was named after a dog Thurber gave to his daughter. John Monroe also appears in a 1961 episode of The DuPont Show with June Allyson called "The Country Mouse", starring Orson Bean. This also uses animated versions of Thurber's cartoons, and the story - cartoonist Monroe struggles to finish his work under the pressures of home and office - that could be regarded as an unofficial pilot for the My World series.

Despite the use of "drawings, stories, inspirational pieces and things that go bump in the night by James Thurber" (as stated in the opening credits), the show also contains character and story elements that owe little or nothing to Thurber's work.  For example, there is no Thurber basis for Monroe and daughter Lydia playing chess throughout "Little Girls Are Sugar & Spice - And Not Always Nice!" Although Thurber material is woven around it, the episode's storyline itself is fairly conventional situation comedy.  William Windom, though, was a tournament chess player, so he most likely added that to the storyline as a personal touch.

Despite many positive reviews, moderate Nielsen ratings led NBC to cancel the series after one season. It then went on to win the Emmy Award for Outstanding Comedy Series and Outstanding Continued Performance by an Actor in a Leading Role in a Comedy Series.

CBS reran My World and Welcome to It in the summer of 1972.

Episodes

Awards
My World and Welcome to It won two Emmy Awards in 1970:
 Outstanding Continued Performance by an Actor in a Leading Role in a Comedy Series (William Windom)
 Outstanding Comedy Series

It was also nominated for:
Outstanding Achievement in any area of Creative Arts ("Rally 'Round the Flag Boys" - special photographic effects).

Book

The similarly titled book by James Thurber, My World — And Welcome to It, was published in 1942 by Harcourt, Brace and Company. Part One of this collection contains 22 assorted Thurber short stories and humorous essays, many of them illustrated with his cartoons. Part Two consists of an eight-part comic memoir about France, written in 1937 and 1938, about twenty years after Thurber first arrived there near the conclusion of World War I. None of these stories, however, feature any of Thurber's "Monroe Family" characters.

The tone of these pieces ranges from lighthearted wordplay and dialect ("What Do You Mean It Was Brillig?") to literary satire ("The Macbeth Murder Mystery") to psychological horror ("The Whip-Poor-Will" and "A Friend to Alexander").  The most famous story is "The Secret Life of Walter Mitty," which bears little resemblance to the 1947 film of the same name.

References

External links

 TVParty.com's My World and Welcome to It page
 Flying Dreams' My World and Welcome to It page
 My World and Welcome To It at Television Obscurities

1960s American sitcoms
1970s American sitcoms
1969 American television series debuts
1970 American television series endings
NBC original programming
Television series by CBS Studios
Primetime Emmy Award for Outstanding Comedy Series winners
Television series about families
Television shows about writers
Television shows about comics
Television shows set in Connecticut
Works by James Thurber